Totora District is one of twelve districts of the province Rodríguez de Mendoza in Peru.

References

External links 
 Population of Totora District

Districts of the Rodríguez de Mendoza Province
Districts of the Amazonas Region